Vishwaroopam II, or Vishwaroop II, is a 2018 Indian spy action thriller film written and directed by Kamal Haasan and co-written by Atul Tiwari and Chakri Toleti. It is the sequel to Vishwaroopam (2013) and features Kamal Haasan alongside Rahul Bose, Shekhar Kapur, Pooja Kumar and Andrea Jeremiah, reprising their roles. While the first film was set in the United States, Vishwaroopam II takes place in India. The film was simultaneously shot in Tamil and Hindi.

Produced by Kamal Haasan and Venu Ravichandran in Tamil, the film was promoted by Ekta Kapoor and Shobha Kapoor in Hindi as Vishwaroop II. Initially planned as a late 2013 release, the film was stuck in development hell and was revived only in April 2017 when Haasan took over as producer himself.

Plot 

A prequel and sequel to Vishwaroopam,

RAW Agent Major Wisam Ahmad Kashmiri is given the task to eliminate Al-Qaeda member, Omar Qureshi, and his fellow jihadis, who plan to attack New York City.

Wisam and his team travel to United Kingdom to perform the final rites of their colleague, Dawkins. Nirupama gets jealous of Ashmita's closeness with Wisam and asks her how both are related. Wisam recalls his days in the Indian Army where he found a young, enthusiastic, and brave young lady officer, Ashmita, in a parade and award ceremony. Wisam and Colonel Jagannathan together finalize Ashmita for their project, and she is trained by Wisam. Wisam was chosen for the mission as he is an illegitimate son of a Pakistani and his mother is an Indian woman. Wisam and Ashmita created an impression that she was having an affair with Wizam, to which he was court-martialed for 10 years, for having an affair with an army woman, failing to do his duties. Wisam was imprisoned but, subsequently escapes, with the help of Jagannathan. Wisam was stamped as a wanted militant and he along with Lieutenant Roy aka Imtiaz set for their mission to join Omar's group.

In the present, Wisam, Nirupama, Ashmita and Jagannathan are received by Goswami, their fellow army officer, under the instructions of his superior, Eshwar Iyer. On their way in the car to hand over Dawkins' mortal remains to his family, they are attacked by a group of militants, and their car gets into a fatal accident. While Nirupama, Ashmita, and Jagannathan are trapped in the car, Wisam is thrown out. Wisam and his team are further tracked down by a militant, and he engages in a duel to stop him and subsequently kills him. Goswami succumbs to the accident and dies happily seeing his enemy's face, which used to be his wish as an army officer.

Wisam faints and is immersed in the flashback of his final encounter with Omar. Wizam and Imtiaz work together to take down the terrorist group. Though Jagannathan trusts Wisam completely, his senior officer, Seshadri is suspicious of Wisam, and he never conceals his suspicion of Wisam's loyalty to India. Wisam tries to place a locator to give the coordinates of the Al Qaeda's prime leader Osama to the NATO troops. Omar catches Wisam red-handed and tries to shoot him, which kills Imtiaz. Wisam escapes from Omar and signals flares for the fighter choppers. Wisam is shot heavily, and the army soldiers take him to the hospital, where he is saved eventually.

Back to the present, all the accident victims reach their hotel, where they are received by Eshwar. Eshwar and Wisam engage in an argument for killing the terrorist instead of catching him. Eshwar taunts Wisam with his religion, but Wisam says he is a proud Muslim who is willing to sacrifice his life for his country. Eshwar leaves the place angrily. Wisam and Ashmita scan the room for bugging devices and eventually break one into pieces and ask Eshwar not to try anything with them. Wisam and Nirupama get into a romantic scene but are interrupted by a call for a meeting with Jagannathan, Eshwar, and an ISI agent, who turns out to be Munnavar. Wisam suspects Eshwar's hand in the terrorist attack on them. Wisam, Ashmita, and Nirupama leave to scan a building, along with an ISI agent, in a place outside the city. Wisam and Eshwar engage in a phone call during Wisam's visit to the building to search for bombs. Eshwar insists Wisam to leave the building, but Wisam disobeys. Wisam actually left the building but pretends to have got trapped inside the building. Eshwar triggers a bomb from his cell phone and is quite happy that Wisam is killed. However, Munnavar informs that Wisam is alive, and he escapes the scene. Wisam threatens Eshwar that he has revealed himself and he would hunt him down at any cost. Eshwar kills himself to avoid getting caught by Jagannathan.

The team finds a book on tides receding time, and they trace a 65-year flashback of how 1500 tons of weapons sent by America during the Second World War helped British troops getting sunk under the sea near the London shore and how militants are trying to blow the cesium weapons underwater, creating a tsunami, which can immerse London 10 to 16 meters below sea level. Nirupama, who owns a deep sea diving certificate, dives underwater to examine the intensity of the tsunami triggered. Wisam's acquaintance, Jim, is killed by a militant, and Wisam tracks him down, who tries to blast the 1500-ton bomb underwater. Wisam succeeds in stopping him by killing him.

The team reaches Delhi, and Jagannathan is called alone by his senior for debriefing. Wisam, Nirupama, and Ashmita reach their rooms to have rest. Nirupama gets angry on seeing Ashmita and Wisam sleeping in the same bed. She angrily leaves to a nearby coffee shop, where she overhears Jagannathan's debriefing session with his senior Seshadri. Jagannathan and Seshadri argue on Nirupama's role in the team. Seshadri asks him to get rid of her, but Jagannathan refuses as Wisam loves her more than anything and that they are supposed to respect his feelings. Nirupama is moved by Wisam's love. She returns to him, and the two make love. Nirupama and Wisam later go to meet Wizam's mother, who is an Alzheimer's patient living in a care home. Wisam's mother could not recognize her own son but is always lamenting looking at the childhood photos of her son. Wisam feels very sad and happy simultaneously and gets emotional with his mother. He recalls his days with her during their Kathak sessions.

Ashmita and Nirupama are kidnapped by Salim. Ashmita tries to knock him down, but he kills her and sends her chopped body to Wisam. Wisam goes to Omar to free Nirupama, who is imprisoned with her hands behind her back in handcuffs as Omar's hostage. Wisam begs Omar to spare Nirupama, but Omar refuses as Wisam was the reason behind the death of his family members during the NATO attack. Wisam tells that his wife, son, and nephew are alive. He explains to him that he handed over them to NATO to be taken to a safe haven. Omar insists on killing Wisam but pretends to spare Nirupama. Nirupama is taken to Daryaganj, where Wisam's mother too has been kept as a hostage. Omar plants a bomb on Wisam's neck with a 40-second timer. Nirupama gets devastated on seeing the bomb blast from Daryaganj. Salim tells her that to celebrate 64 years of Indian Independence, they have planted 64 bombs which would blast by an SMS. Wisam shatters the window from outside and kills Salim. A short flashback shows how Wisam escaped the bombing in a few seconds knocking everyone down and how the bomb blast burnt Omar alive. Wisam instructs his men to stop the mass bombing.

In the hospital, Wisam shows Omar's sons to Omar stating that Jalal (the elder son) has finished engineering and moving to London for MTech and Nasser (the younger son) is in his first year of med-school. Omar, on his death bed, realizes his mistake and dies. Wisam, along with Nirupama, quietly walk out of the hospital.

Cast

 Kamal Haasan as Vishwanathan / R&AW Agent Major Wisam Ahmad Kashmiri, a former soldier of the Indian army and agent of R&AW who has infiltrated the Al Qaeda during America's War on Terror; his past comes back to haunt his present
 Rahul Bose as Omar Qureshi, the main antagonist and Wisam's former friend whom he sees as a traitor and villain for the supposed death of his family
 Pooja Kumar as Dr. Nirupama Vishwanathan / Nirupama Kashmiri, Wisam's wife with knowledge of scuba diving and a doctorate in nuclear oncology
 Andrea Jeremiah as Ashmita Subramaniam, Wisam's friend and member of the army whom Nirupama gets jealous of because of her and Wisam's history.
 Shekhar Kapur as Colonel Jagannathan (Jaganath in Hindi), one of Wisam's mentors and higher orders during his infiltration and best friend of deceased John Dawkins and Gowswami
 Jaideep Ahlawat as Salim, secondary antagonist, and Omar's deputy
 Russell Geoffrey Banks as Jim, Wisam's assistant with his operations
 Waheeda Rehman as Kashmiri's mother, who's also an Alzheimer's victim
 Anant Mahadevan as Eshwar Iyer, Jagannathan/Jaganath and Goswami's boss who is revealed to be a traitor working for Omar
 Mir Sarwar
 Deepak Jethi
 Jude S. Walko as Captain Joe Black

Production

Development
The film is set in India. Kamal has earlier stated that the second part will be laced with a strong mother-son sentiment. He stated that 40% of the film was shot during the making of part one itself. While part 1 was a little over 2 hours 20 minutes, the sequel's length will be less than 2 hours.

Cast and crew
Due to personal reasons, cinematographer Sanu Varghese opted out of Vishwaroopam II and was replaced by Shamdat Sainuddeen. Ghibran was signed up to compose the music. Haasan has added Waheeda Rahman and  Anant Mahadevan for the sequel in addition to the main cast.

Filming
The shooting of Vishwaroopam II started in Thailand and the team shot scenes at the Bangkok airbase.  There was a sequence where actors defuse bombs and engage enemies in a gun battle underwater which was done by the actors themselves after training in scuba diving. The Chennai schedule of the film started on 13 June 2013. It was also reported that an underwater fight sequence involving Kamal Haasan has been shot by stunt director Ramesh in the second week of October 2016. The film started its final schedule of shooting from 27 November 2017 at Chennai. Some promotion of the film took place on the television series Bigg Boss Tamil 2, which is hosted by Hasaan, as well as on Bigg Boss Malayalam and also in Indian Idol and Dus Ka Dum hosted by Salman Khan.

Music
The soundtrack album and background score for Vishwaroopam II is composed by Ghibran, replacing Shankar-Ehsaan-Loy who composed for the first part. The lyrics for the songs of the Tamil version were written by Vairamuthu and Kamal Haasan, and the songs of the Hindi version were written by Prasoon Joshi and Sandeep Srivastava. The soundtrack rights for the Tamil version were acquired by Lahari Music, whereas the Hindi version was acquired by T-Series.

Kamal Hassan, penned and sung the song "Naanagiya Nadhimoolame" along with Kaushiki Chakraborty and Karthik Suresh Iyer, which was released as a single track by composer Ghibran, via his official Twitter account on 29 June 2018. The partial audio launch of the film was held on 30 June 2018 during the ongoing Bigg Boss Tamil 2 season. The event was telecasted on 1 July 2018, through Star Vijay. Kamal Hassan and Shruti Hassan performed the songs "Naanagiya Nadhimoolame" and "Gnyabagam Varugiradha" at the event. The latter was released a single track on 2 July 2018. While Shruti Hassan performed the song at the event, the original version of the song which was written by Vairamuthu, were rendered by Aravind Srinivas and Sarath Santhosh. The third single track "Saadhi Madham" was released on 27 July 2018. Written by Kamal Haasan and sung by Sathyaprakash and Andrea Jeremiah, the song was performed at the ongoing Bigg Boss Tamil 2 season. The full album, which consists of an EDM version of "Gnyabagam Varugiradha" and the karaoke versions of all the songs, were launched on 5 August 2018.

The title track of Vishwaroop II, which was written by Prasoon Joshi and Sandeep Shrivatsava and sung by Aravind Srinivas and Sarath Santhosh, was launched on 25 July 2018. The full soundtrack album was released on 3 August 2018.

Marketing
The first look poster of the film was released on 2 May 2017, the theatrical trailer was released on 11 June 2018.

Release

Theatrical
Vishwaroopam II was scheduled to release in February 2014, but due to delays, Hassan postponed the release. Haasan also stated initially that the film would be released as a direct to home feature in the United States. However, he later stated that he would not, as "there seems to be a lot of reticence in that." In November, Haasan stated that he hopes to release the film by 2016, but the release of the film is on hold due to the financial crisis of the producer even though some combination scenes, as well as VFX, are pending. It was also reported that Haasan will complete his portions only after his remaining salary of Rs.10 crores is settled and Lyca Productions might take over the project from Aascar Ravichandran.

In February 2017, Kamal Haasan revealed that the film was on hold as Aascar Ravichandran was not able to pay the technical crew of the film. He added that over six months' worth of post-production remained pending on the project.

The film was released theatrically on 10 August 2018.

Home media
The digital rights of the film were sold to Amazon Prime Video, while the satellite rights of the Tamil version, Vishwaroopam 2 were sold to STAR Vijay.

Reception

Box office
Vishwaroopam 2 grossed  from the Tamil Nadu box office in its first 7 days.

Critical response
The film received mixed reviews from critics. Rachit Gupta of The Times of India has given 2.5 stars and summarized "Despite having some genuinely good moments, the film tries to put forth a little too much, a little too quickly.". Behindwoods given 3 stars out of 5 and said "Vishwaroopam 2 is a fitting sequel to the masterpiece". Baradwaj Rangan of Film Companion said "A not-exactly-needed sequel, but a solid delivery mechanism for Kamal-isms". Raisa Nasreen of DGZ Media summarized "Kamal Haasan is heroic as the one man army". Sowmya Rajendran of The News Minute said "A predictable sequel short of fresh ideas". Vishal Menon of The Hindu wrote "Add that to particularly tacky production design and uninspiring visuals, you realise that it’s easy for someone to mistake the first part as the newer film. By the end of Vishwaroopam 2 , we’ve seen so many bombs being planted, only for them to be defused. What’s another 100 more?" Ashameera Aiyappan of The Indian Express gave the film 3.5 stars and wrote "Do catch Vishwaroopam if possible before watching the second part. You won’t lose anything if you don’t, but there is a lot to gain if you do." Subra Gupta of The Indian Express gave the film 1.5 out of 5 stars and stated that "That leaves Kamal Haasan, who has co-written, directed and produced the film, as the patriotic RAW agent, to do all the heavy lifting. In the first edition, the veteran star-actor led from the front: here the ‘dirty soldier turned bloody espionage agent’ is all thundery lines like ‘main mazhab nahin mulk ke liye khoon bahaata hoon’. But even he can't rise above the shockingly inept script, which he rescues only in a few places, when his trademark intelligent, wry self-awareness manages to kick in. The rest can be safely ignored." Saibal Chatterjee of NDTV gave 1.5 out of 5 stars and wrote "That pretty much sums up Vishwaroop 2. It repeatedly fires blanks - noisy but of no use. Has a movie sequel ever been so pointless?. Janani K of India Today gave 2 out of 5 stars and wrote "On the whole, Vishwaroopam 2 is a story that is let down by the shoddy screenplay. Even a star performer like Kamal Haasan couldn't save the audience from this mess." Karishma Shetty of Pinkvilla wrote "Is Vishwaroopam 2 worth a watch? I would recommend you to see Mission Impossible - Fallout instead.  If it is of any interest, the first part of the franchise was honoured with Best Production at the National Film Awards. We rate it a 35% in the movie meter. Priyanka Sundar of Hindustan Times gave 2.5 out of 5 stars and wrote "That, however, is not the biggest problem of Vishwaroopam. That indubitably is Kamal directing the film as a director and not filmmaker. We can see the savvy politician Kamal is doing great onscreen. Wisam, unfortunately, is lost in the back ground." Shreedhar Pillai of Firstpost gave the film 2.5 out of 5 stars and stated that "The USP of the film is Kamal Haasan, who doesn’t look his age (63) and does action, romance and dialogue-delivery with consummate ease and style. Some of the action scenes are well choreographed. Ghibran’s music is a major plus point. But the sequel is nowhere near the first part and looks stretched (2 hours 21 minutes). Though part two lacks the finesse of part one, Vishwaroopam 2 is still an entertainer." Bollywood Hungama gave the film's rating 1.5 out of 5 and wrote "On the whole, Vishwaroop II is a highly avoidable flick. The film has too many tracks and the narration and execution is flawed and weak. Also at the box office, the film will have a tough time."

Sudhir Srinivasan of The New Indian Express gave the film 3.5 out of 5 and wrote "It’s such small, effective moments that make me feel quite fondly about the Vishwaroopam films, and despondently about Tamil cinema without Kamal Haasan, the director." Reshe Manglik of India TV gave 2 out of 5 stars and wrote "In short, it’s only Kamal Haasan doing all the work in the film. He delivers the thundery lines like ‘Main mazhab ke liye nahi mulk ke liye khoon bahata hu’ with immense grit. However, even a spectacular actor like Haasan can't rise above the script that was clearly sinking." Anupama Subramanian of Deccan Chronicle gave 3.5 out of 5 stars and wrote "To be fair, most of these stunts and action sequences are riveting and enjoyable. Kamal is ever present with his dry wit and self-aware punch dialogues, which also brings his political aspirations to the fore. He is relentless and although he looks burnt out due to Vis’s heavy workload, his brains never tire and is always a step ahead of his numerous halfwit villains. Enjoyable in parts!" Moviecrow gave the film's rating 3 out of 5 stating that "An engaging sequel despite the inevitable comparison with the prequel and a few misfires. Watch it for Kamal Haasan's unsatiating desire to push the bar higher.  " Umesh Punwani of Koimoi rated the film 1.5 out of 5 stars and wrote "All said and done, fans of Vishwaroop should forget there was a sequel planned for it. They should again watch the part 1 instead and keep its memories intact. It’s like one of those many Hollywood actioners which are all glam and no content." DNA India gave the film's rating 2 out of 5 and wrote "Vishwaroop 2 boasts of some great cameos by Shekhar Kapur, Waheeda Rahman and Jaideep Ahlawat but they are so good in whatever little screen-time they have got that sometimes you feel they are wasted in the film. The spy-thriller doesn't rely much on jingoism, though, which is a relief." Ananda Vikatan rated the film 42 out of 100.

Notes

References

External links
 
 
 

2018 films
2010s Hindi-language films
2018 action thriller films
Films directed by Kamal Haasan
Indian action thriller films
Indian sequel films
Films about the Research and Analysis Wing
2010s Tamil-language films
Indian multilingual films
Reliance Entertainment films
Films scored by Mohamaad Ghibran
War in Afghanistan (2001–2021) films
Films set in Delhi
Films about terrorism in India
Films set in Chennai
Indian Army in films
Films set in Kent
2018 multilingual films